Frederic-Hans von Rosenberg (26 December 1874 – 30 July 1937) was a German diplomat and politician. He served as Reichsaußenminister (Foreign Minister of Germany) in the cabinet of Wilhelm Cuno in 1922–1923.

Early life 
 
Rosenberg was born as Frederic (or Friedrich) Hans von Rosenberg on 26 December 1874 in Berlin, Kingdom of Prussia (present-day Germany).

Career 
In 1897, Rosenberg was awarded the degree of Dr.Jur. and entered the Prussian judicial service, in which he was promoted to Assessor in 1903. That year he transferred to the foreign service (Auswärtiges Amt, AA). In 1910, Rosenberg became the head of the Balkans department at the AA, and in 1912 was promoted to Vortragender Rat.

During the First World War, he was a member of the German delegation negotiating with the Soviet Union at Brest-Litowsk and with Romania at Bucharest. In 1918–1919, he was at the German Embassy to Switzerland at Bern. In 1919, Rosenberg became Dirigent—head of the political department of the AA. In 1920–22, he was Ambassador at Vienna, and in 1922 briefly at Copenhagen.

He was Foreign Minister of Germany from November 1922 to August 1923 in the cabinet of chancellor Wilhelm Cuno.

From 1924 to 1933, he was Ambassador at Stockholm and then served from 1933 to 1935 as ambassador in Ankara. In 1935, he was  given an indefinite leave (im einstweiligen Ruhestand).

Personal life 
Rosenberg died on 30 July 1937 at Fürstenzell, in Bavaria, Germany.

References

Further reading
 Maria Keipert (ed.): Biographisches Handbuch des deutschen Auswärtigen Dienstes 1871–1945. Published by the Auswärtiges Amt, Historischer Dienst. Volume 3: Gerhard Keiper, Martin Kröger: L–R. Schöningh, Paderborn u. a. 2008, .
 Frederic von Rosenberg. Korrespondenzen und Akten des deutschen Diplomaten und Außenministers 1913–1937. Edited by Winfried Becker. Deutsche Geschichtsquellen des 19. und 20. Jahrhunderts, Volume 66. Published by the Historische Kommission bei der Bayerischen Akademie der Wissenschaften, Klaus Hildebrand and Gerrit Walther. Oldenbourg Verlag, Munich 2011, .
 Winfried Becker: Frederic von Rosenberg (1874–1937). Diplomat vom späten Kaiserreich bis zum Dritten Reich, Außenminister der Weimarer Republik. Schriftenreihe der Historischen Kommission bei der Bayerischen Akademie der Wissenschaften, Volume 83. Vandenhoeck & Ruprecht, Göttingen 2011. .

1874 births
1937 deaths
Ambassadors of Germany to Austria
Ambassadors of Germany to Turkey
Politicians from Berlin
Foreign Ministers of Germany
German untitled nobility
People from the Province of Brandenburg